Brigitte Lesage (born 18 June 1964) is a French beach volleyball player. She competed in the women's tournament at the 1996 Summer Olympics.

References

1964 births
Living people
French women's beach volleyball players
Olympic beach volleyball players of France
Beach volleyball players at the 1996 Summer Olympics
Sportspeople from Mulhouse